Ivanščica or Ivančica is a mountain in northern Croatia.

The rivers of Bednja, Lonja, Krapina and Veliki potok rise and flow in the area.

On March 16, 1983, at 13:52:52, Ivanščica was the epicenter of a very strong (MCS VII) earthquake.

References

Mountains of Croatia
Landforms of Varaždin County
Landforms of Krapina-Zagorje County
Tourist attractions in Krapina-Zagorje County